The building of the United States Court of Military Appeals, formerly known as the District of Columbia Court of Appeals, is a historic building located at 450 E St., Northwest, Washington, D.C.  It is regarded as "a particularly fine and remarkably early example of revived (20th century) Greek Revival architecture."

History 
The building was completed in 1910.  It served as the D.C. Court of Appeals until 1952, when the U.S. Court of Military Appeals took it over.   It was designed by the Architect of the Capitol, Elliott Woods, to be compatible with the Washington City Hall (1820), designed by George Hadfield and Robert Mills.

It was listed on the National Register of Historic Places in 1974.

When nominated in 1973, it was serving the United States Court of Appeals for the Armed Forces.

References 

Government buildings completed in 1908
Government buildings on the National Register of Historic Places in Washington, D.C.
Judiciary Square
Neoclassical architecture in Washington, D.C.
1908 establishments in Washington, D.C.